General Major Arjan Zaimi (born 1957) is Albania's representative to NATO.

In 2007, he was the first contender to be the President of Albania after the negotiations of majority and opposition for the consensual name of the head of state.

References

Permanent Representatives of Albania to NATO
1957 births
Living people
Place of birth missing (living people)
Date of birth missing (living people)
21st-century Albanian people